K27EC-D, virtual and UHF digital channel 27, was a low-powered Cornerstone Television-affiliated television station licensed to Lake Havasu City, Arizona, United States. K25HD-D (virtual and UHF digital channel 25) in Bullhead City served as a translator of K27EC-D. K27EC-D was owned by Lake Havasu Christian Television, while K25HD-D was owned by Richard D. Tatham.

K25HD-D's transmitter was located approximately 12 miles (20 km) northwest of Bullhead City on Spirit Mountain, where it served both Bullhead City and Laughlin.

K27EC-D's transmitter was located on Goat Hill, approximately 5 miles (8 km) north of Lake Havasu City.

Until 2011, the stations also provided over-the-air service to Kingman, Arizona via translator station K16GB.

History

K27EC-D
An original construction permit for a low-power station on channel 27 was issued on March 19, 1993 to Lake Havasu Christian Television. After several extensions of the construction permit, the station was licensed on March 1, 1996 and upgraded its license to Class A in September 2001. It had been known as K27EC since the original permit. Following conversation to digital broadcasting, the station changed its call sign on July 25, 2011 to K27EC-CD and again on October 18, 2011 to K27EC-D. The station also surrendered its digital class A license to the FCC on April 8, 2013, reverting to a standard digital low-power license.

K25HD-D
An original construction permit for a low-power station on channel 65 was issued on February 20, 1992 to Richard D. Tatham. The station, known as K65FI, was originally to specify Laughlin as its city of license, but changed to Bullhead City during the course of construction. After several extensions of the construction permit, the station was licensed on April 5, 1996. In 2000, required to abandon the 700 mHz spectrum, K65FI applied to move to channel 25; the application was granted in May 2001. The station also sought to convert its license to Class A. The upgrade was approved in September 2001 and the station was licensed as K25HD on June 4, 2004. Following conversion to digital broadcasting, the station changed its call sign on November 30, 2011 to K25HD-D. The station surrendered its digital class A license to the Federal Communications Commission (FCC) on April 8, 2013, reverting to a standard digital low-power license.

The FCC cancelled both K27EC-D and K25HD-D's licenses on October 7, 2022, due to failure to file applications to renew the licenses.

Digital television

Digital channels

K27EC-D digital channels
K27EC-D's digital signal was multiplexed:

K25HD-D digital channels
K25HD-D's digital signal was multiplexed:

Analog-to-digital conversion
The FCC gave low-power television station licensees and construction permit holders the option of either applying for a separate companion channel for digital operations during the DTV conversion, or to turn off the analog broadcast signal and turn on the digital signal (known as a "flash cut"). Tatham and Lake Havasu Christian Television opted for the latter course of action, and applied for flash cut conversions on both K27EC and K25HD. On July 24, 2006, K25HD was granted authorization to construct digital facilities on channel 25 and flash cut to digital. The digital flash cut application for K27EC has not yet been approved by the FCC as of March 2007.

References

External links
CTVN official site

Religious television stations in the United States
27EC-D
Television channels and stations established in 1996
Low-power television stations in the United States
1996 establishments in Arizona
Defunct television stations in the United States
Television channels and stations disestablished in 2022
2022 disestablishments in Arizona